Kwon Jae-chan (Korean:권재찬; born 1969) is a South Korean serial killer who robbed and murdered three people between 2003 and 2021 in the Michuhol District of Incheon, South Korea. He was arrested shortly after his last two murders and sentenced to death.

Early life 
In 1969, Kwon Jae-chan, the second oldest of three children, was born in Incheon. In school, Kwon received low grades in every subject, and he was frequently bullied. When he reached secondary school, Kwon repeatedly ran away from home. In December 1985, Kwon was sentenced to juvenile detention for trespassing and theft. Shortly after he was released, Kwon dropped out of school and briefly worked as a hairdresser. On March 30, 1987, he was sentenced to eight months in prison and two years of probation for theft.

In November 1991, Kwon entered an unlocked house in Michuhol-gu, Incheon. Once inside, he raped a woman and attempted to rob her. He was then sentenced to six years in prison for sexual assault, robbery, and attempted blackmail. After he was released from prison in October 1997, Kwon entered another unlocked home where he assaulted a woman and stole 2.6 million won from her. For this crime, he was sentenced to five years in prison.

Murders 
In January 2003, Kwon bludgeoned a 69-year-old pawnshop owner to death in Michuhol-gu, Incheon. He then stole 320,000 won from the pawnshop, but was caught after attempting it into Japan. For the murder, he was sentenced to 15 years in prison. While imprisoned, he assaulted a fellow inmate. He was also diagnosed with raynaud syndrome and several mental illnesses, including depression.

After being released from prison in 2018, Kwon worked at a construction site, but he soon became involved with gambling and owned 90 million won in debt. Because of this, Kwon planned to rob and murder another person to pay off his debt. At about 7 a.m. on December 4, 2021, Kwon assaulted a 59-year-old woman in the parking garage of a building in Michuhol-gu, Incheon. He then strangled the woman to death and hid her body in the trunk of a car. Kwon and an accomplice used the victim's credit card to withdraw 4.5 million won from an ATM. They also stole an additional 11 million won in jewelry. The following day, Kwon bludgeoned his accomplice – a middle-aged man – to death on a hill near Eulwangri Beach on Incheon's Yeongjong Island, and buried him nearby.

Arrest 
On December 7, 2021, Kwon Jae-chan was arrested and charged with two counts of murder, abandonment of a corpse, and robbery. On 22 June 2022, Kwon was sentenced to death.

See also 
Capital punishment in South Korea
 Crime in South Korea
 List of serial killers by country
 List of serial killers active in the 2020s

References 

1969 births
Living people
South Korean serial killers
Male serial killers
People convicted of murder by South Korea
Prisoners sentenced to death by South Korea
People convicted of theft
People convicted of sexual assault
People convicted of robbery
South Korean prisoners sentenced to death